Dismodicus is a genus of dwarf spiders that was first described by Eugène Louis Simon in 1884.

Species
 it contains six species:
Dismodicus alticeps Chamberlin & Ivie, 1947 – Russia (Far East), Canada, USA
Dismodicus bifrons (Blackwall, 1841) (type) – Europe, Russia (Europe to Far East)
Dismodicus decemoculatus (Emerton, 1882) – USA, Canada, Greenland
Dismodicus elevatus (C. L. Koch, 1838) – Europe, Russia (Europe to West Siberia)
Dismodicus fungiceps Denis, 1945 – France
Dismodicus modicus Chamberlin & Ivie, 1947 – USA (Alaska)

See also
 List of Linyphiidae species (A–H)

References

Araneomorphae genera
Linyphiidae
Palearctic spiders
Spiders of North America
Spiders of Russia